The second season of the reality television series Love & Hip Hop: New York aired on VH1 from November 14, 2011, until February 6, 2012. The show was primarily filmed in New York City, New York. It was executively produced by Mona Scott-Young for Monami Entertainment, Toby Barraud and Stefan Springman for NFGTV, and Jim Ackerman and Jeff Olde for VH1.

The series chronicles the lives of several women and men in the New York area, involved in hip hop music. It consists of 11 episodes, including Reality Check, a reunion special hosted by Mona Scott-Young.

Production
On May 25, 2011, VH1 announced that Love & Hip Hop would be returning for a second season. The series premiered on November 14, 2011. All main cast members from the previous season returned, along with new cast members Kimbella Vanderhee, the girlfriend of Juelz Santana, and Yandy Smith, Jim Jones' manager. Teairra Marí and Erica Mena appeared as supporting cast members.

The season was released on DVD in region 1 on June 26, 2012.

Synopsis
Picking up where last season left off, Chrissy is still waiting for her dream wedding and struggling with Jim's commitment issues. Jim's mother Nancy has released a diss track "Psychotic" aimed at Chrissy, capitalizing off Chrissy's insult during a fight last season. Emily has finally left Fab, tired of his constant infidelity. Olivia's single "December" didn't exactly set fire to the charts like she hoped it would and she still can't get a record deal, much to the frustration of her manager Rich. Somaya is still hustling hard, trying to get her various business ventures off the ground, amid tensions with her manager Maurice.

Emily decides to have an "emancipation" party with the girls to celebrate her break-up with Fab. Yandy, Jim's manager of seven years, brings along Kimbella, a video vixen and the baby mama of Juelz Santana. During the party, Kimbella admits to having had sex with Fab three years ago, while Emily was pregnant with Fab's child. Chrissy reacts violently to this revelation, sucker punching Kimbella in the face and attempting to stomp her head into the ground before being pulled away by security. Chrissy blames Yandy for the fiasco and Yandy's relationship with Chrissy and Jim begins to disintegrate.

Meanwhile, Somaya reaches a breaking point and fires Maurice. Olivia struggles with her identity as a recording artist. Emily tries to transition to single life with help from her friend, singer Teairra Marí. However, after Fab turns up at Emily's fashion show, she takes him back. Kimbella is dealing with Juelz' infidelity and her own lingering issues with her mother when she encounters a new enemy in Erica Mena, a fellow video vixen and model.

Chrissy leaves New York with the girls for Miami, after making it clear to Jim that she is not willing to wait much longer for his commitment. Jim follows and surprises Chrissy with a touching proposal. However, her happiness is short-lived when she comes face to face with Yandy at a night club and all hell breaks loose. The season ends with Emily taking a stand with Fab, Kimbella coming to a crossroads with Juelz, Somaya leaving New York for Los Angeles, Olivia refusing to compromise her career for a record deal and Jim and Chrissy severing their relationship with Yandy for good.

Reception
The season garnered big ratings for the network, averaging 2.8 million total viewers per episode, making it VH1's highest rated series in over three and a half years. Overall, the series was the #8 highest rating series on cable in 2011.

Cast

Starring

 Chrissy Lampkin (11 episodes)
 Emily Bustamante (11 episodes)
 Kimbella Vanderhee (11 episodes)
 Olivia Longott (11 episodes)
 Somaya Reece (7 episodes)
 Yandy Smith (11 episodes)

Also starring

 Jim Jones (10 episodes)
 Rich Dollaz (8 episodes)
 Maurice Aguilar (2 episodes)
 Nancy "Mama" Jones (8 episodes)
 Teairra Marí (7 episodes)
 Erica Mena (6 episodes)

Juelz Santana, Somaya's investor Barry, Mama Jones' friend and producer Freddie Robinson Jr. and executive producer Mona Scott-Young appear in several episodes as guest stars. The show also features minor appearances from notable figures within the hip hop industry and New York's social scene, including Emily's daughter Taina Williams, Midi Mafias Swift, Fabolous, Kimbella's mother Sherry Vanderhee, Rico Love, Cam'ron, Winter Ramos, Funkmaster Flex and Jerry "Wonda" Duplessis, along with uncredited cameos from DJ Self, Lil' Kim, Jonathan Fernandez, Monie Love and Freekey Zekey.

Episodes

Webisodes

Bonus scenes
Deleted and extended scenes from the season's episodes were released weekly as bonus content on VH1's official website. 

One scene features Maino, who would join the cast in a larger role in season nine.

Music
Several cast members had their music featured on the show and released singles to coincide with the airing of the episodes.

References

External links

2011 American television seasons
2012 American television seasons
Love & Hip Hop